The 2017 Lisboa Belém Open was a professional tennis tournament played on clay courts. It was the first edition of the tournament which was part of the 2017 ATP Challenger Tour. It took place in Lisbon, Portugal between 12 and 18 June 2017.

Singles main-draw entrants

Seeds

 1 Rankings are as of 29 May 2017.

Other entrants
The following players received wildcards into the singles main draw:
  Frederico Ferreira Silva
  André Gaspar Murta
  João Monteiro
  Gonçalo Oliveira

The following players received entry from the qualifying draw:
  Dragoș Dima
  Gonzalo Escobar
  Hubert Hurkacz
  Daniel Muñoz de la Nava

Champions

Singles

 Oscar Otte def.  Taro Daniel 4–6, 6–1, 6–3.

Doubles

 Ruan Roelofse /  Christopher Rungkat def.  Fred Gil /  Gonçalo Oliveira 7–6(9–7), 6–1.

References

Lisboa Belém Open
Lisboa Belém Open
2017 Lisboa Belém Open
2010s in Lisbon